Michael Burton is an American politician and former theatre performer serving as a member of the Missouri House of Representatives from the 92nd district. Elected in November 2020, he assumed office on January 6, 2021.

Early life and education 
Burton was born in Affton, Missouri. He graduated from Christian Brothers College High School in St. Louis and briefly attended Lindenwood University, though he left the school to move to New York City and perform on Broadway.

Career 
In 2001, Burton originated the role of Ben Rogers in the Broadway production of The Adventures of Tom Sawyer. He also appeared on the cast recording of the show. Burton returned to Missouri in 2011 and worked as a teacher. He became involved with local politics and activism when he joined a movement to prevent the construction of a housing development on the site of Tower Tee, a historic golf course. Burton was elected to the Missouri House of Representatives in November 2020 and assumed office on January 6, 2021.

Electoral History

References 

Living people
Democratic Party members of the Missouri House of Representatives
Actors from Missouri
Male actors from Missouri
People from Affton, Missouri
21st-century American politicians
Year of birth missing (living people)